Eldorado, or El Dorado, is a small town in the north-east of Victoria, Australia. At the 2016 census, Eldorado had a population of 264, down from a population of 287 at the time of the 2006 census.

History
Eldorado was named after the legend of El Dorado in 1840 by William Baker, the name he used for his run. Even though the name refers to a land abounding in gold there was no gold found in Eldorado until the 1850s when it became a thriving gold rush town. Eldorado Post Office opened on 1 August 1861.

The town's population declined sharply after the area ceased to yield gold.

The remains of an old gold dredge can still be seen today.
This is a large steel dredge which was designed and built by Thompson's Engineering for the Cocks Eldorado Gold Dredging Company in 1935–36. By the time it was decommissioned it had dredged 30 million cubic metres from the river flats of the Eldorado Plain. It has 110 digging buckets, each of which was capable of digging and lifting 0.3 cubic metres of soil.

The dredge received an Engineering Heritage National Marker from Engineers Australia as part of its Engineering Heritage Recognition Program.

Gallery

References

External links

 Parks Victoria's guide to the Cocks Eldorado gold dredge.

Towns in Victoria (Australia)
Rural City of Wangaratta